Chua Koon Siong (born 27 August 1948) is a Singaporean former weightlifter. He competed in the men's featherweight event at the 1976 Summer Olympics.

References

External links
 
 

1948 births
Living people
Singaporean male weightlifters
Olympic weightlifters of Singapore
Weightlifters at the 1976 Summer Olympics
Place of birth missing (living people)
Weightlifters at the 1974 Asian Games
Asian Games competitors for Singapore
Commonwealth Games medallists in weightlifting
Commonwealth Games bronze medallists for Singapore
Weightlifters at the 1982 Commonwealth Games
20th-century Singaporean people
Medallists at the 1982 Commonwealth Games